Anna Alt or Soloist Anna Alt is a 1945 German drama film directed by Werner Klingler and starring Anneliese Uhlig, Will Quadflieg and Emil Lohkamp. A gifted pianist gives up her career to support her composer husband.

It was one of twelve films released in Nazi Germany in 1945, due to increasing difficulties of film production during the later stages of the Second World War. It premiered at the Marmorhaus in Berlin.

Cast

References

Bibliography

External links 
 

1945 films
Films of Nazi Germany
German drama films
1945 drama films
1940s German-language films
Films directed by Werner Klingler
Films about pianos and pianists
Films about composers
German black-and-white films
Tobis Film films
1940s German films